Falguera may refer to:
Petrocoptis pseudoviscosa, "falguera", species in the plant family Caryophyllaceae, endemic to the Spanish province of Huesca

Fèlix Maria Falguera,  Spanish jurist 
Antoni de Falguera, Catalan architect
Álex Gallar Falguera, Spanish footballer
Íñigo de Arteaga y Falguera, 18th Duke of the Infantado, Spanish peer

See also
Margarita Salas Falgueras, Spanish scientist, 1st Marchioness of Canero